In mathematics, the Gelfand–Naimark theorem states that an arbitrary C*-algebra A is isometrically *-isomorphic to a C*-subalgebra of bounded operators on a Hilbert space.  This result was proven by Israel Gelfand and Mark Naimark in 1943 and was a significant point in the development of the theory of C*-algebras since it established the possibility of considering a C*-algebra as an abstract algebraic entity without reference to particular realizations as an operator algebra.

Details
The Gelfand–Naimark representation π is the direct sum of representations πf
of A where f ranges over the set of pure states of A and πf is the irreducible representation associated to f by the GNS construction.  Thus the Gelfand–Naimark representation acts on 
the Hilbert direct sum of the Hilbert spaces Hf by

π(x) is a bounded linear operator since it is the direct sum of a family of operators, each one having norm ≤ ||x||.

Theorem. The Gelfand–Naimark representation of a C*-algebra is an isometric *-representation.

It suffices to show the map π is injective, since for *-morphisms of C*-algebras injective implies isometric. Let x be a non-zero element of A.  By the Krein extension theorem for positive linear functionals, there is a state f on A such that f(z) ≥ 0 for all non-negative z in A and f(−x* x) < 0.  Consider the GNS representation πf with cyclic vector ξ. Since

it follows that πf (x) ≠ 0, so π (x) ≠ 0, so π is injective.

The construction of Gelfand–Naimark representation depends only on the GNS construction and therefore it is meaningful for any Banach *-algebra A having an approximate identity.  In general (when A is not a C*-algebra) it will not be a faithful representation.  The closure of the image of π(A)  will be a C*-algebra of operators called the C*-enveloping algebra of A. Equivalently, we can define the 
C*-enveloping algebra as follows: Define a real valued function on A by

as f ranges over pure states of A.   This is a semi-norm, which we refer to as the C* semi-norm of A.  The set I of elements of A whose semi-norm is 0 forms a two sided-ideal in A closed under involution.  Thus the quotient vector space A / I is  an involutive algebra and the norm

factors through a norm on A / I, which except for completeness, is a C* norm on  A / I (these are sometimes called pre-C*-norms). Taking the completion of A / I relative to this pre-C*-norm produces a C*-algebra B.

By the Krein–Milman theorem one can show without too much difficulty that for x an element of the Banach *-algebra A having an approximate identity:

It follows that an equivalent form for the C* norm on A is to take the above supremum over all states.

The universal construction is also used to define universal C*-algebras of isometries.

Remark.

See also
 GNS construction
 Stinespring factorization theorem
 Gelfand–Raikov theorem
 Tannaka–Krein duality

References 

  (also available from Google Books)
 , also available in English from North Holland press, see in particular sections 2.6 and 2.7.

Operator theory
Theorems in functional analysis
C*-algebras